The Lufttransport Staffel 6 (LT St6 or LT 6) is a transport squadron of the Swiss Air Force. The pilots associated with it are part of the Berufsfliegerkorps. A third of the pilots are militia pilots employed by civilian employers. The Lufttransport Staffel 6 together with the Lufttransport Staffel 8 is part of the Lufttransport Geschwader 2, which belongs to the Flugplatzkommando 2 (airfield command 2) at Alpnach Air Base.

Lufttransport Staffel 6 carries as  coat of arms an oval badge with the front view of a black fly on a white ground, above and below a red area. The abbreviation "LT" stands at the top in the red area, the number 6 is at the bottom. The camouflage version of the coat of arms shows the same image, but in dark green shades instead of white and red.

History 
The expansion of the helicopter fleet in the Swiss Air Force started in  the early 1960s. This led to the formation of Lufttransport Staffel 8 and Lufttransport Staffel 6. Lufttransport Staffel 6 is equipped with 15 Alouette III helicopters. It completed its first retraining course from October through November 1967. The Lufttransport Staffel 6 used the Alouette III helicopters until 2010. According to today's Lufttransport Staffel 6 and the groundcrew organization, the separation of the groundcrew and air component originated in 1974. In 1992, Lufttransport Staffel 6 introduced the AS332M1 Super Puma, and in 2001 it introduced the AS532UL Cougar helicopters. Since 2010, Lufttransport Staffel 6 has also used the Eurocopter EC635. The former commander of Lufttransportstaffel 6, Bernhard Müller, is scheduled to become the new commander of the Swiss Air Force on 1 January 2018 .

Lufttransport Staffel 6 is tasked with helicopter air transport throughout Switzerland.

Aircraft
 Alouette III 
 AS332M1 Super Puma
  AS532UL Cougar
 Eurocopter EC635

References

External links 
  Official VBS page about the Lufttransport Staffel 6
Flieger-Flab-Museum

Swiss Air Force
Military units and formations established in 1965